Jonas Myrin is a Swedish singer, songwriter and producer based in Los Angeles, California. His solo career began in 2012 with the gold-certified song, "Day of the Battle" in Germany. Myrin won two Grammy Awards for the song "10,000 Reasons (Bless the Lord)", which he wrote for Matt Redman. He also won both Billboard and multiple Dove Awards, as well as many nominations for those awards. He has written songs for artists such as Barbra Streisand, Idina Menzel, Andrea Bocelli, Lauren Daigle, Nicole Scherzinger, and others, and has often produced the works.

Early life 

Myrin began playing the piano at an early age and wrote his first song at the age of eleven. His parents did charity and ministry work around the world. Growing up, his parents shared their favourite music with him including Stevie Wonder, The Beatles, Donny Hathaway records, which he has cited as a major influence on his work.

At 17, Myrin moved to London, where he studied at a creative arts college. There he was involved with Hillsong London and co-wrote several songs that were featured on various albums by Hillsong Music. In the years that followed, he wrote songs for artists including members of rock music's Supergrass, as well as Bjorn from Peter Bjorn and John, Natasha Bedingfield and Greg Kurstin, among others.

In 2002, he appeared in the music video for the Sophie Ellis-Bextor song "Get Over You".

Musical career 

In 2007, Myrin co-wrote "Yours" for Steven Curtis Chapman's album, This Moment. The song spent twenty-six weeks on the Hot Christian Songs chart. "Yours" won Song of the Year at the BMI Music Awards the following year.

Together with John Hill, Myrin wrote "Run Run Run" and "A Little Too Much" in 2010 for Bedingfield's album, Strip Me, and the latter song became the end title for the Warner Bros film, Something Borrowed, starring Kate Hudson. That same year, he wrote "Our God" for Chris Tomlin, which received a Grammy Award nomination, and won both Dove and Billboard awards. "Our God" has had nearly 400 million global streams.

Myrin wrote the song "Period" as the opening theme of the Japanese anime series, Fullmetal Alchemist: Brotherhood. The song was performed by Japanese pop duo, Chemistry, and reached No. 12 on the Oricon weekly charts for eight consecutive weeks.

In June 2012, Myrin released his first solo single, "The Day of the Battle", on EMI Records and it was certified gold in Germany, and went Top 40 on Germany's radio playlists. On New Year's Eve 2014, he performed the song for hundreds of thousands of people live at The Brandenburg Gate on a bill with Pet Shop Boys, Bonnie Tyler and Loreen. Myrin toured with Katie Melua and Sunrise,REF and others, and performed on German television shows including ZDF TV Show Bauhaus, the Golden Henne Award, and The Fernsehgarte.

He co-wrote "10,000 Reasons (Bless the Lord)" with Matt Redman (who performed the song). The song won two Grammys and spent 16 weeks at the top spot on Christian Radio and remained No. 1 on the Billboard Christian Songs Chart for four months.

Myrin continued to write and co-write for other artists. In 2012, he co-composed "Cornerstone" for Hillsong, and a year later, along with Peter Kvint, co-wrote "One and Only One" for the Korean duo Tohoshinki. The latter song went to No. 1 in Japan.

In 2015, Myrin signed a global publishing deal with Universal Music Group and Capitol CMG Publishing.  

Myrin has collaborated on a number of songs with Lauren Daigle, including "Loyal" in 2016. 

Myrin's song, "Your Spirit", which he co-wrote with Kim Walker-Smith, Matt Redman and Natasha Cobbs Leonard, became an international hit with Cobb's recording, propelling the album "Heart" to No. 1 on the Gospel Album chart. The song took off and Walker-Smith and Gabriella Rocha collaborated for a Portuguese version called "Teu Espírito", and it was released in Brazil.

In 2018, Myrin wrote the AC hit, "Great Things", with Phil Wickham for his Living Hope album, and the song was nominated for Worship Recorded Song of the Year in the Dove Awards 2020. Later in the year, Myrin was chosen by Universal Music Publishing's stable of songwriters to travel to Rio de Janeiro, Brazil, to compose with Vanessa da Mata Ana Carolina, and Antonio Villeroy.

"Being able to absorb these different genres is fascinating," Myrin told UBC – União Brasileira de Compositores magazine while he was in Brazil. "You can write a bossa nova in Los Angeles. But it's not the same as composing with someone who has it in their blood.

In 2018, Myrin began a professional relationship with Barbra Streisand. He co-wrote and co-produced four songs on Streisand's album Walls including "What's On Your Mind", "Don't Lie to Me", "The Rain Will Fall", and "Better Angels". (the latter produced by David Foster). Walls reached No. 6 on Billboard 200 chart. Walls was nominated for Grammy Award for Best Traditional Pop Vocal Album at the 2020 Grammy Awards, and was named one of Rolling Stone magazine's 20 Best Pop Albums of 2018.

Myrin worked with France's Gaëtan Roussel on his Traffic album, including songs "Tu Me Manques", "Le jour et a nuit" – on which he played piano, and the single, "Hope" featuring his vocals. "...sometimes you meet someone very different from you, something can happen out of that," said Roussel of working with Myrin." 

For Andrea Bocelli, he co-wrote "Gloria the Gift of Life", which appeared on Bocelli's album, Si, the first classical album to reach No. 1 on the Billboard 200 in the United States as well as on the United Kingdom's album chart. The song was featured as the end title of the movie Fatima.

In 2019, Myrin performed "That's What Friends Are For", together with his songwriting collaborator Carole Bayer Sager, as well as Patti LaBelle, Desmond Child and Jordan Smith, at the Songwriters Hall of Fame 50th Annual Induction and Awards Dinner in New York City, in honour of Carole Bayer Sager receiving the Johnny Mercer Award.

Later that year, in sessions at Myrin's Hollywood studio, he co-wrote "Thank Me Later", "Lonely" and Stranger" with Devon Gilfillian for his debut album Black Hole Rainbow. The album, which the New York Times called a "formidable debut", was nominated for a Grammy for Best Engineered Album, Non-Classical category in 2021. 

Together with Pussycat Doll, Nicole Scherzinger, Myrin co-wrote "Victorious", in March 2019, which they performed at the Special Olympics World Games in Abu Dhabi that year. The track, produced by The Futuristics, was created as motivation for the athletes with the lyrics. Headlining that Special Olympics opening ceremony, Now United performed Myrin's song, "Beautiful Life", which he co-wrote and was released as a single on Simon Fuller's XIX International project Now United.

In June 2019, Celine Dion recorded "Play Me Like A Love Song", which Myrin wrote with Carole Bayer Sager. Late that year, he co-wrote "At This Table", a song about inclusivity, for Idina Menzel's holiday album A Season of Love. It was one of the most streamed Christmas songs that year. 

That was followed by "Love We're Going to Lose" for Craig Stickland's album, Starlit Afternoon. During 2020, Myrin fostered a professional relationship with the Kelly Family. Initially, he wrote "Sweet Freedom" on the group's album, 25 Years Later Live. The album made No. 1 in Germany. He then wrote and produced four songs for Patricia Kelly's album, One More Year, and sang a duet with her on the song, "Don't Lose Hope", featured on the same album.

Barbra Streisand encouraged Myrin to step into the spotlight as an artist and release his own songs, and a year later, in August 2020, he released his American debut single, called "Not Alone", with Capitol Music Group and an EP is set to follow in 2021. The lyrics of "Not Alone", co-written with Crispin Hunt (Lana Del Rey, Florence and the Machine, Ellie Goulding), were inspired by a time when Myrin lived in London and found himself overcome by loneliness in the big city. "Not Alone" features string arrangements by Erik Arvinder (Childish Gambino, John Legend) conducting the Stockholm Symphony, and was co-produced by Elias Kapari. In September 2020, Myrin also released an alternate version of "Not Alone", this one with The Stockholm Symphony.

The music video for "Not Alone" was filmed in Joshua Tree featuring Myrin driving solo across the Mojave desert from sunrise to sunset, a visual of his admitted soul searching journey that year.

Myrin's collaborations continued as he worked on his solo material. He wrote the anthem "No Fear" on Kari Jobe's No. 1 album The Blessing: Live, that was released October 2020.

Myrin reunited with Idina Menzel in a duet for a new version of "At This Table" that he produced for a deluxe version of the album,  A Season of Love, sold at Target stores Christmas 2020. Together, Myrin and Menzel performed "At This Table" and his own single, "Just a Breath Away (Noel)", at the USO Christmas Holiday special in 2020.

Soundtracks 

Myrin's work has been included on soundtracks starting in 2011 with, "A Little Too Much" with Natasha Bedingfield. The song was used over the end credits for the Warner Bros. film, Something Borrowed, featuring Kate Hudson.

In 2017, he wrote and sang the song, "Sadness (Who's Laughing Now)" for Sony Pictures' film, Rough Night, featuring Scarlett Johansson. A year later, he co-wrote "Gloria the Gift of Life" for Andrea Bocelli. The song was featured as the end title music for the movie Fatima in 2020.

In 2020, he wrote "Together in This", the end title song used for Jungle Beat: The Movie sung by Natasha Bedingfield. Myrin and Bedingfield performed the song and were interviewed on television programs around the globe, including South Africa's Afternoon Express, the ABC television network's Live with Kelly and Ryan and CBS television network's The Talk. Forbes noted that the release of the song during the COVID-19 pandemic was "an especially pertinent offering. It's an upbeat celebration of all the forces that bind humanity together—and more importantly, that these connections are necessary for our collective survival.In 2020, he was commissioned to write the theme song, "Just a Breath Away (Noel)", for the holiday film, The Three Wise Men, directed by Yarrow, and featuring narration from the late Andy Griffith.

 Awards 
 Dove Award for Worship Song of the Year for "Our God" (Chris Tomlin) in 2011
 Two Dove Award nominations for "Our God" (Chris Tomlin) in 2011
 Billboard Music Award for Top Christian Song for "Our God" (Chris Tomlin) in 2011
 Grammy Award nomination for "Our God" (Chris Tomlin) in 2011
 Grammy Award for Best Contemporary Christian Music Song for "10,000 Reasons (Bless the Lord)" (Matt Redman) in 2013
 Grammy Award for Best Gospel Performance for "10,000 Reasons (Bless the Lord)" (Matt Redman) in 2013
 Billboard Music Award for Top Christian Song for "10,000 Reasons (Bless the Lord)" (Matt Redman) in 2013
 Dove Awards for Song of the Year Pop Contemporary, Praise and Worship Song, Songwriter of the Year, Contemporary Christian Performance for "10,000 Reasons (Bless the Lord)" (Matt Redman) in 2013
 Dove Award for Contemporary Gospel/Urban Song of the Year for "Our God" (Chris Tomlin) in 2014
 Dove Award nomination for Contemporary Gospel/Urban Song of the Year for "Our God" (Chris Tomlin) in 2014
 Dove Award nomination for "Let It Be Jesus" in 2016
 Dove Award nomination for Urban Worship Recorded Song of the Year for "The Name of Our God" (Tasha Cobbs Leonard) in 2018
 Dove Award nomination for Worship Recorded Song of the Year "Great Things" (Phil Wickham) in 2020

 Discography 

Solo
 Day of the Battle (2012)
 Dreams Plan Everything'' (2013)
 "Sadness" (2017)
 "Not Alone" (2020)
 "Not Alone (Stockholm Symphony Version) (2020)
 "Just a Breath Away (Noel)"

References

External links 

 

Living people
Hillsong musicians
People from Örebro
Swedish Pentecostals
Year of birth missing (living people)